Winfield Denton Ong (born 1958) is an Assistant United States Attorney in the Southern District of Indiana and is a former nominee to be a United States district judge of the United States District Court for the Southern District of Indiana.

Biography

Ong received a Bachelor of Arts degree, cum laude, in 1980 from DePauw University. He received a Juris Doctor in 1985 from the Lewis & Clark Law School. He began his legal career as an attorney for the Law Office of Donald C. Reid in Portland, Oregon, from 1985 to 1987. He served as a law clerk to Judge Gene Edward Brooks of the United States District Court for the Southern District of Indiana, from 1987 to 1989. From 1989 to 1995, he served as an assistant United States Attorney in the Southern District of Indiana in the Civil Division. From 1995 to 1996, he worked as the Director of Program Integrity for Anthem Inc., a health insurance carrier. He has served as an Assistant United States Attorney in the Southern District of Indiana in the Criminal Division since 1996, serving as Chief of the Criminal Division since 2014.

Expired nomination to district court

On January 12, 2016, President Obama nominated Ong to serve as a United States District Judge of the United States District Court for the Southern District of Indiana, to the seat vacated by Judge Sarah Evans Barker, who took senior status on June 30, 2014. On May 18, 2016 the Judiciary Committee held a hearing on his nomination. On June 16, 2016 his nomination was reported out of committee by voice vote. His nomination expired on January 3, 2017, at the end of the 114th Congress.

References

1958 births
Living people
Assistant United States Attorneys
DePauw University alumni
Indiana lawyers
Lewis & Clark Law School alumni
Oregon lawyers
People from Ann Arbor, Michigan